"Noche de ronda" is a waltz written by Mexican songwriter and composer Agustín Lara and published in 1935. Mexican singer Elvira Ríos sang the song in the 1937 film ¡Esos hombres!. It became her signature song and one of the biggest hits of her career. She recorded it four times: in 1936, as a 78 rpm single for RCA Victor; in 1940, for her Decca album Tropic Nights; in 1957, for her RCA Victor album Noche de ronda; and in 1974, for her Orfeón album La emocional Elvira Ríos.

Agustín Lara, Pedro Vargas, Toña la Negra, Nestor Mesta Chayres and Eydie Gormé with Los Panchos have also recorded the song.

References

External links 
 Elvira Ríos' 1957 studio recording of "Noche de ronda" at YouTube
 Noche de Ronda as performed by Nestor Mesta Chyares with the Alfredo Antonini Orchestra on Archive.org

1935 songs
Waltzes
Spanish-language songs